Baltic Workboats AS is an Estonian shipbuilding company with shipyards in Nasva, Estonia and Tampa, Florida, the United States. Baltic Workboats has built more than 200 different sized boats and vessels for pilots, coast guards, police, fishery inspections, research institutes and several harbors.

History

1967
Ship repair yard with small harbor and slipway was established.

1998–2000
A new era under new owners began. Full-scale modernization was carried out. New contemporaneous shipbuilding structures with the latest equipment were built. The first 14 m aluminum pilot boat called Watercat Pilot 140 was launched for Estonian Pilot organization.

2000–2010
Baltic Workboats continued with Watercat Pilot series. In 2004 the first 19.5 m fast 50-knots-riding patrol boat was launched, the Baltic 1800. Also many other aluminum workboats were produced. Number of different 24–26 m Baltic 2400 series fast patrol vessels in different modifications were delivered to many countries. Two contracts for building of 24 meter catamarans signed. These new buildings were realized together with Australian experienced catamaran designer Incat Crowther.

2010–present
26.5 m fast patrol vessels were delivered for the Swedish Coast Guard. In 2015, the first 45 m ice classed double-ended car ferry for Estonian small island connections was delivered. In 2020, two patrol vessels were delivered to the Estonian Navy.

References

External links
 
 

Engineering companies of Estonia
Shipbuilding companies of Estonia
1967 establishments in Estonia
Manufacturing companies established in 1967
Shipbuilding companies of the Soviet Union